The North Texas Philosophical Association (NTPA) is a philosophical organization.

References

External links 
NTPA website

Philosophical societies in the United States
Organizations based in Texas